The following is a list of notable correspondence (Epistolae) of the Dutch philosopher Benedictus de Spinoza (1633-1677) with well-known learned men and with his admirers. These letters were published after Spinoza's death in the Opera Posthuma (Dutch translated edition: De nagelate schriften, 1677). Spinoza had preserved the incoming letters and drafts of the letters he sent. In total 88 letters, predominantly concerning  philosophical subjects have been handed down: 50 by Spinoza and 38 by his correspondents, 52 written in Latin and 26 in Dutch. The letters discuss topics from Spinoza's own work including infinity and the attributes (properties) of "God", Spinoza's concept of the universe) but also touch on subjects such as ghosts and scientific discoveries, for example the vacuum.

Table of selected letters

The date of the letter is given with a correction for the Old/New Style dating system. A selection from the letters:

References

Baruch Spinoza
Collections of letters